This article lists cities and towns in Colombia by population, according to the 2005 census. A city is displayed in bold if it is a capital city of a department.

List

See also
 List of cities
 List of cities in Colombia by population, a list that only includes cities with no less than 100,000 residents in order of population size (instead of alphabetical order).
Departments of Colombia

References

External links
 

 
Colombia
Colombia
Colombia
Cities